The 1990 Manjil–Rudbar earthquake occurred on Thursday, June 21, 1990 at  in northern Iran. The shock had a moment magnitude of 7.4 and a Mercalli Intensity of X (Extreme).

Damage and casualties
Widespread damage occurred to the northwest of the capital city of Tehran, including the cities of Rudbar and Manjil. The National Geophysical Data Center estimated that $8 billion in damage occurred in the affected area. Other earthquake catalogs presented estimates of the loss of life in the range of 35,000–50,000, with a further 60,000–105,000 that were injured.

Use in media
Acclaimed Iranian director Abbas Kiarostami has fictionally incorporated the earthquake and its effects on northern Iran into multiple films of his. In And Life Goes On (1992), a director and his son search for child actors from a previous Kiarostami film; Where Is the Friend's Home? (1986), which was shot in a city that, by the time of the second film's production, is recovering from the earthquake. Kiarostami's next film Through the Olive Trees (1994) follows a film crew as they shoot scenes from Life, and Nothing More...; in one of these scenes a man discusses his marriage having taken place a day after the earthquake. Critics and scholars often refer to these three films as the Koker trilogy, and rank them among the director's finest works.

See also

 List of earthquakes in 1990
 List of earthquakes in Iran

References

Sources

Further reading

External links

 7.4 - northern Iran – United States Geological Survey
 

Man
Earthquakes in Iran
Earthquake
June 1990 events in Asia
History of Gilan
1990 disasters in Iran